Anson Akenside Hull Tuttle (1820/1821 – 7 September 1866) was an American tavern keeper, judge and Republican politician. Tuttletown, California, was named for him.
 
Born in New York (?) or Illinois, he removed to California, where he built a log cabin in 1848 in what would become Tuolumne County. He was a member of the California State Assembly, 1858–59. He was Secretary of State of California in 1863. In 1866 he was California State Treasurer.

Tuttle died of lung hemorrhage at the age of 45, while he was visiting Donner Lake to improve his health. He is interred in the Sacramento Historic City Cemetery in Sacramento, California.

References

1850 Tuolumne Co., CA, U.S. Federal Census, Sht. 306, p. 153 B, line 11.

External links
A.A.H. Tuttle at the Political Graveyard
 

1820s births
1866 deaths
Republican Party members of the California State Assembly
Secretaries of State of California
American judges
People from Tuolumne County, California
19th-century American politicians
19th-century American judges